The Prince of Wales Hotel is a heritage-listed hotel in Bunbury, Western Australia. Located at 41 Stephen Street in Bunbury's central business district, it originally opened in a house in 1882. A second building was added in 1892, and extensive renovations in 1906 joined the two structures.

In modern times it has become a popular live music venue, and a heritage restoration was completed in 2014.

References

External links 

Hotels in Western Australia
Buildings and structures in Bunbury, Western Australia
1882 establishments in Australia
State Register of Heritage Places in the City of Bunbury